Roberto de Jesus Machado (born 1 January 1990), known as Bebeto, is a Brazilian footballer who plays as a right back for Portuguese club Tondela.

Career statistics

References

External links

1990 births
Living people
Brazilian footballers
Brazilian expatriate footballers
Association football defenders
Campeonato Brasileiro Série B players
Campeonato Brasileiro Série C players
Campeonato Brasileiro Série D players
Primeira Liga players
Esporte Clube Bahia players
Associação Desportiva Bahia de Feira players
Paulista Futebol Clube players
Esporte Clube Rio Verde players
Sociedade Esportiva e Recreativa Caxias do Sul players
Esporte Clube São Bento players
C.S. Marítimo players
C.D. Tondela players
Expatriate footballers in Portugal
Sportspeople from Sergipe